Frank Rodney Reed (born May 13, 1954) is a former professional American football player who played cornerback for five seasons in the National Football League (NFL) with the Atlanta Falcons.

Playing career
Before the 1981 season, the Falcons traded Reed to the Green Bay Packers with Dewey McClain for Steve Luke and a draft pick. In 1983 he played for the Birmingham Stallions of the United States Football League.

References

1954 births
Living people
American football cornerbacks
American football safeties
Atlanta Falcons players
Birmingham Stallions players
Washington Huskies football players
Players of American football from Seattle